Abu Nuwas is an impact crater on the planet Mercury, 116 kilometers in diameter. It is located at 17.4°N, 20.4°W. It is named after the Arab poet Abu Nuwas, and its name was approved by the International Astronomical Union in 1976. There is small central peak in the center of the floor of Abu Nuwas, and bright features known as hollows are present near the peak.

To the north of Abu Nuwas are the craters Ts'ai Wen-Chi and Rodin. To the southwest is the crater Molière, and the crater Aśvaghosa can be found toward the south.

References

Impact craters on Mercury